Jail Breakers is a 2002 South Korean comedy film directed by Kim Sang-jin and starring Sol Kyung-gu, Cha Seung-won and Song Yoon-ah. It was a box office hit with a total of 3,073,919 admissions nationwide, making it the 4th highest grossing Korean film of 2002.

Plot
Two long-term prisoners manage to break out of jail by tunneling underneath the prison wall with a spoon. Upon returning to society, they read in the newspaper that they are scheduled to be pardoned under a special amnesty on the very next day. The desperate warden agrees to pretend nothing happened if they can break back into prison unnoticed.

Cast
 Sol Kyung-gu as Yu Jae-pil
 Cha Seung-won as Choi Mu-seok
 Song Yoon-ah as Han Gyeong-sun
 Kang Sung-jin as Yong Mun-sin
 Kang Shin-il as Prison warden
 Yoo Hae-jin as Police officer
 Lee Hee-do as Director 
 Park Jeong-hak as FM
 Jang Tae-sung as Cheol-gu
 Kim Young-woong as Head of academic affairs

Awards and nominations

References

External links
 
 
 

2002 films
2000s Korean-language films
South Korean buddy comedy films
2010s buddy comedy films
Films directed by Kim Sang-jin (film director)
South Korean films remade in other languages
2010s South Korean films
2000s South Korean films